Man Sasaki ( Sasaki Man; 20 April 1926 – 7 April 2022) was a Japanese politician. A member of the Liberal Democratic Party, he served in the House of Councillors from 1976 to 1998. He died in Akita on 7 April 2022 at the age of 95.

References

1926 births
2022 deaths
20th-century Japanese politicians
Liberal Democratic Party (Japan) politicians
Members of the House of Councillors (Japan)
Recipients of the Order of the Sacred Treasure, 1st class
University of Tokyo alumni
Politicians from Akita Prefecture